Gibberula diadema is a species of sea snail, a marine gastropod mollusk, in the family Cystiscidae.

Description
The length of the shell attains 2.2 mm.
44

Distribution
This marine species occurs off Senegal.

References

External links
 MNHN, holotype

diadema
Gastropods described in 1995
Cystiscidae